Lu Hsi-chuen (born 10 December 1953) is a Taiwanese professional golfer.

Lu had considerable success on the Asia Golf Circuit from 1979 through to the late 1980s, winning ten tournaments, including nine national opens, and capturing the circuit title four times, in 1979, 1980, 1981 and 1986. Lu also played on the Japan Golf Tour, winning twice.

After ending his playing career, Lu became a golf instructor at Sunrise Golf Academy in Yangmei, Taoyuan City, Taiwan.

Lu is the nephew of Lu Liang-Huan.

Professional wins (13)

Japan Golf Tour wins (2)

Japan Golf Tour playoff record (2–1)

Asia Golf Circuit wins (11)
1979 Indonesia Open, Malaysian Open, Singapore Open
1980 Indonesia Open, Philippine Open, Thailand Open
1981 Malaysian Open
1983 Philippine Open
1986 Indian Open, Taiwan Open
1989 Maekyung Open

Team appearances
Amateur
Eisenhower Trophy (representing Taiwan): 1976

Professional
World Cup (representing Taiwan): 1979, 1980
Dunhill Cup (representing Taiwan): 1997

References

External links

Taiwanese male golfers
Japan Golf Tour golfers
Living people
1953 births